Richard Short (fl. bef. 1750, aft. 1766) was a military artist, best known for sketches he made of Quebec City, shortly after its capture by British forces. The appearance of many of the old French régime's principal buildings are known only from Short's sketches. He is also known for his sketches of Halifax, Nova Scotia, and notable naval engagements of the times.

Life
The Dictionary of Canadian Biography describes Short as a military officer, noting that in the days before photography officers were encouraged to learn how to paint or draw images for military purposes. But it also notes that he was merely a ship's purser, in Quebec.
Short served aboard British Royal Naval ships
HMS Baltimore built 1742,
Peregrine built 1749,
Mermaid which sailed without him to Nova Scotia in 1754, 
Gibraltar built 1754,
Leopard,
the Prince of Orange which brought him to Quebec in 1759,
Dublin which returned from the West Indies in 1763 and 
Neptune, before accepting an appointment at the Royal Navy's Chatham Dockyard.

Short served on HMS Prince of Orange from 1759 to 1761, and he was directed to make drawings, to record the appearance of principal Quebec buildings, following its capture. Parliament passed an act directing the publishing of the twelve drawings. Two sets of Canadian prints were published, Twelve Views of the Principal Buildings in Quebec (1761), and Six views of the town and harbour of Halifax in Nova Scotia (1777).

On February 2, 2017, the Montreal Gazette published an article about one of Short's drawings of Quebec, as part of its coverage of Black History Month.  The image showed a number of distant figures, including a black boy, in fancy clothes, attending a pair of affluent civilians, inspecting damage to a church. The article claims, Short captured “...the first image of a black person in Quebec, maybe even in Canadian history,” most likely a slave.

Some sources describe Short as part of the British garrison, as a Major, or Naval Captain.

References

External links 

Royal Navy personnel of the Seven Years' War
18th-century war artists